Curtis Rainford Anderson (born 27 September 2000) is an English footballer who plays as a goalkeeper for Northern Premier League club Lancaster City.

Club career
In 2012, at 11-years old, Anderson moved from Blackpool to Manchester City for a fee of £15,000. Anderson played with Manchester City's youth and academy sides until moving to second-tier North American side Charlotte Independence in March 2019.

Anderson and Charlotte Independence mutually agreed to terminate his contract on 29 August 2019.

Wycombe Wanderers
On 2 September 2020, he signed for Championship club Wycombe Wanderers on a one-year deal. In May 2021, it was confirmed that his contract had been extended by a further year.

Walton Casuals (loan)
On 27 October 2020, Anderson joined Southern League Premier Division South side Walton Casuals on loan. However, the club's season was halted shortly after his arrival, before ultimately their season was outright cancelled on 24 February 2021.

Eastbourne Borough (loan)
On 9 July 2021, Anderson signed for National League South side Eastbourne Borough on loan for the entire of the 2021–22 season.

Lancaster City
It was announced on 31 January 2022 that Anderson has signed for Lancaster City, upon his release from Wycombe Wanderers.

International career
Anderson was a squad member for the England under-17 team that finished runners up at the 2017 UEFA European Under-17 Championship. In October 2017, Anderson was included in the squad for the 2017 FIFA U-17 World Cup. He saved a penalty and then converted his own as England defeated Japan in a penalty shoot-out to reach the quarter-finals. Anderson played in the final as England defeated Spain to lift the trophy.

Honours

National
England U17 
FIFA U-17 World Cup: 2017
UEFA European Under-17 Championship runner-up: 2017

References

External links

2000 births
Living people
English footballers
English expatriate footballers
Expatriate soccer players in the United States
England youth international footballers
Association football goalkeepers
Manchester City F.C. players
Charlotte Independence players
Wycombe Wanderers F.C. players
Walton Casuals F.C. players
Eastbourne Borough F.C. players
USL Championship players
Southern Football League players
Lancaster City F.C. players